Pancho Campo (born September 13, 1961, in Santiago, Chile) is a Spanish event organiser, former tennis professional, captain of the Chilena Olympic Team in Barcelona 92 and Davis Cup Coach for the Qatar National Team. He was, from 2008 until May 2012 accredited with the title of Master of Wine. He was the first Chilean to pass all the exams of the Master of Wine certification, and has conducted seminars and wine tastings with wine experts in more than 20 countries.

Career

Chrand Marketing & Events
Campo is the CEO of Chrand Marketing & Events, which specializes in the marketing and organization of sporting, musical, wine and environmental events. The company has organized concerts with artists including Sting, Pink Floyd, UB40, Enrique Iglesias and Tom Jones. In sport, Chrand has organized the Davis Cup, the Indoor Trial World Cup, the Pro Beach Soccer Tour and tournaments with Andre Agassi, Stefan Edberg and Pat Cash. It has also organized conferences with speakers such as Al Gore, Kofi Annan, Juan Verde and Francis Ford Coppola.

Tennis Professional
Campo is a former tennis professional. He participated in the 1992 Summer Olympics in Barcelona as a coach for the Chilean Female Olympic Tennis Team. Campo was the National Tennis Director for the Qatar Tennis & Squash Federation and the Davis Cup coach, leading the Qatari team to win Davis Cup in 1994 and the GCC Games. He was also the coach of several professional tennis players in the ATP Tour, such as Gilles Bastié, Tomás Carbonell, Billy Uribe and Juan Carlos Baguena amongst others. Pancho worked for the tennis academy of Nick Bollettieri for over 7 years, in the US, Spain and the Middle East. He also founded the International Tennis Coaches Symposium that took place in Murcia, Barcelona, Madrid and Alicante. He was instrumental in the development of the Bollettieri International Coaches Program. He conducted numerous tennis exhibitions and the Pancho Campo Tennis Show with celebrity players such as Andre Agassi, Pat Cash, Stefan Edberg, Emilio Sánchez Vicario, Richard Krajicek and Arantxa Sánchez Vicario, amongst many others.

The Wine Academy of Spain
In 2003, Campo founded The Wine Academy of Spain and developed the Spanish Wine Education international certification program, the representative of the Wine & Spirit Education Trust (WSET) for Spain. The academy was involved in the research of climate change in the wine industry and organised the World Conference on Climate Change and Wine in 2006 and 2008. Campo was trained by former U.S. Vice President Al Gore and is a part of The Climate Project. In 2008, Campo became the first Spanish Master of Wine, though was alternately cited the first MW of Chile.

He has carried out more than 100 conferences in over 30 different countries, including Winefuture Rioja 2009, Winefuture Hong Kong 2011, Climate Change and Wine 2011, Innova Marbella 2013, and Thinking Green Gibraltar.

2009 Trial
Ahead of the Winefuture Rioja 09 event with international wine personalities including Robert Parker, Jancis Robinson MW, Oz Clarke, Steven Spurrier, Miguel Torres, Robert Joseph and Gary Vaynerchuk due to speak, an outstanding warrant for the location of Campo issued by the UAE in 2003 and subsequent Interpol Red Notice became public knowledge. In October 2009, Campo announced he had resigned as president of The Wine Academy of Spain and stepped down as director of the Winefuture Rioja, to be replaced by Kevin Zraly, in order to 'focus on clearing his name'.
In July 2010 Interpol removed from their website the warrant for Campos' location, and Campo issued a message to the press stating, "I have been informed today that Interpol accepted my request to take my name out of their list. They have found that a mistake was made and an injustice was committed against me".

2011 Controversy
In October 2011, Campo was involved in the controversy of paid-for wine visits to wineries with Dr. Jay Miller (the official critic reviewing Spanish wine for Robert Parker's publication The Wine Advocate) termed "Jumillagate" or "Murciagate" or "Campogate". The story was revealed by Vincent Pousson, Jacques Berthomeau and Jim Budd, which grew to attract wide attention in the wine journalism industry and resulted in the departure of Miller from The Wine Advocate. Having received a formal complaint into Campo's alleged conduct, in December 2011 the Institute of Masters of Wine launched an investigation into whether Campo had breached its code of conduct. Separately Parker announced he had initiated a legal investigation into the events to be conducted by Steve Haas of the law firm Cozen O’Connor.

Campo resigned from the institute of the Masters of Wine on May 3, 2012, informing of his move away from wine and into more sports and music events. Following Campo's resignation, the Institute of Masters of Wine terminated its investigation of the alleged breaches of code of conduct.

See also
List of wine personalities

References

External links
Winefuture official site
The Wine Academy of Spain official site
Chrand

1961 births
Living people
Spanish tennis coaches